The Dognecea mine is a large open pit mine in the western of Romania in Caraș-Severin County, 23 km west of Reșița and 509 km north-west of the capital, Bucharest. Dognecea represents one of the largest iron ore reserves in Romania having estimated reserves of 9 million tonnes of ore. The mine produces around 10,000 tonnes of iron ore/year.

References 

Iron mines in Romania